The Sukhoi Su-75 Checkmate (LTS, short for Light Tactical Aircraft in Russian) is a single-engine, stealth fighter aircraft under development by Sukhoi for export and for the Russian Aerospace Forces. The Sukhoi Design Bureau also designates the aircraft as T-75 with marked registration RF-0075.

Development
A static mock-up was unveiled at the 2021 MAKS air show with President of Russia Vladimir Putin in attendance. The Checkmate's maiden flight was first scheduled for 2023 and then slipped to 2024, with initial deliveries planned for 2026–2027. The Checkmate is designed to be low cost and for export, and may compete with the Lockheed Martin F-35 Lightning II and Shenyang FC-31 aircraft of the same light to medium-weight category. Production is forecast to be 300 planes over 15 years.

According to the chief executive of Rostec, Sergei Chemezov, the LTS Checkmate is expected to cost US $25–30 million each.

On 14 November 2021, it was reported that the production of several prototypes of the Checkmate had begun at the Komsomolsk-on-Amur Aircraft Plant, where the Sukhoi Su-57 is manufactured.

Su-75 Checkmate development could be delayed due to international sanctions on Russia, and Russia could not import semiconductors and high-tech machining equipment from the European Union. The potential export sales also stalled because Russia cannot trade using U.S. dollars.

On 16 August 2022, United Aircraft Corporation reported that they plan to build four prototypes of the Su-75 Checkmate, with flight tests planned for as early as 2024.

Design 
The Su-75 Checkmate has a diverterless inlet, a v-shape tail and internal weapons bays—all features intended to reduce radar signature.  The wing area appears large, which has been interpreted by correspondent David Axe to imply that Sukhoi designed the fighter to fly and engage in  combat at high altitudes— or higher.

The angular ventral inlet, which wraps around the lower nose section, shares features with a diverterless supersonic inlet (DSI) design concept first introduced in the Boeing X-32 aircraft.  A diverterless supersonic inlet (DSI) is mechanically simple; DSI can reduce cost compared to more intricate inlet designs such as Boeing F-15 and Sukhoi Su-27.  Instead of separate horizontal and vertical stabilizers with moving rudders and elevators, the Su-75 fighter has "ruddervators" similar to that of Northrop Grumman YF-23.  Ruddervators require sophisticated flight-control systems to be developed by Sukhoi as the functionality does not exist in Su-35 and Su-57 fighters.

The fighter will also feature an internal weapons bay with five missiles and an autocannon.

Engine 

The powerplant appears to be the Saturn izdeliye 30 engine which will also power the Sukhoi Su-57's Su-57M variant. The izdeliye 30 is designed to be 30% lower specific weight than its AL-41F1 predecessor, and up to 18% more effective, with an estimated thrust of 107.9 kN (24,300 lbf) dry and 171.7 kN (38,600 lbf) in afterburner. Once in series production, the izdeliye 30 engine will have a much longer life span than other Russian engines.

Cockpit 
Due to restrictions preventing taking cockpit photos, NBC News Matt Bodner, the first Western journalist able to see the jet in person, provided a preview without a point of view photo. According to Bodner, the cockpit layout is identical to the Su-57 with a glass cockpit with two 38 cm (15 in) main multi-functional LCD displays similar to the arrangement of the Su-35S. The cockpit has a wide-angle (30° by 22°) head-up display (HUD).

Avionics 
The electronic infrastructure of the Checkmate is all open-architecture and makes use of "Matryoska" diagnostics systems that are mostly on-board. According to Russian newspaper Top War, the prototype Su-75 is built with an active phased array radar. According to Yuri Beliy, NIIP radar design bureau plans to develop a low-cost AESA radar for the aircraft. According to Deputy Prime Minister Yuri Borisov, the Checkmate will share the same components and avionics as the Su-57 as a cost-reduction mechanism by the Sukhoi Design Bureau.

Armament 
The Rostec chief executive said in an interview with The Wall Street Journal that the Su-75 fighter will carry more than 7 tonnes of air-to-air and air-to-surface armaments and will be capable of striking several targets at a time.

Variants
An unmanned variant is reportedly in development, a two-seat trainer version can be developed if requested, and a carrier-based version is also under consideration.

Potential operators 
Rostec is anticipating that Argentina, India and Vietnam will become the primary export destinations for the aircraft, with the African market also showing interest. Sukhoi aims to export 300 Su-75 Checkmate aircraft to African countries over the next 15 years. The jet has also been pitched for export to Turkey, India, Saudi Arabia and the United Arab Emirates.

In SITDEF-2021, Alexander Mikheev, the General Director of product export of Rosoboronexport stated that there was interest in the Su-75 in a number of South American countries.

Specifications

See also

References

External links
 

LTS
2020s Russian fighter aircraft
Single-engined jet aircraft
Stealth aircraft